Pink sauce refers to any sauce that is pink or pinkish in color:
 Cocktail sauce
 Vodka sauce
 Fry sauce, a combination of tomato ketchup and mayonnaise
 Marie Rose sauce, a British condiment made from fresh tomatoes and mayonnaise
 A blend of marinara sauce with alfredo cheese sauce, sometimes known as Parma Rosa sauce
 Pink Sauce, a dipping sauce that gained virality on TikTok for its controversy

Sauces